Garliava, is a city in Lithuania, considered a suburb of Kaunas. In 1809 Józef Godlewski built a Holy Trinity church and named it Godlewo in his own honour, although Lithuanians started calling it Garliava. This year is generally viewed as the year Garliava was founded. It lay along a significant postal route between Saint Petersburg, Kaunas, Marijampolė, and Warsaw.

Godlewski also built a place of worship for Lutherans and a synagogue for Jews.

Name
Garliava is the Lithuanian name of the city. Versions of the name in other languages include Polish: Godlewo, Russian: Годлево Godlevo, Belarusian: Гадле́ва Gadleva, Yiddish: גודלעווע Gudleve, Latvian: Garļava.

Notable residents 
Juozas Gabrys (1880 – 1951), politician and advocate of Lithuanian independence, was born in Garliava. In his memoirs, he referred to himself as the "Count of Garliava."
Darius Labanauskas (*1976), darts player

Education 
In a relatively small area of 3,65 km2., there are five schools located in this suburb of Kaunas: Garliavos Juozo Lukšos gymnasium, Garliavos Jonučių high school, Garliava high school, Kindergarten and primary school of Garliava and Garliava school of arts and music.

Sport 
 FK Garliava football club;
 Stadium of the school of Adomas Mitkus.

References

  History of Garliava. Eldership of Garliava.

External links 
 Godlewo in the Geographical Dictionary of the Kingdom of Poland (1881)

 
Cities in Lithuania
Cities in Kaunas County